Çılğır (also, Çiləqir, Çiləgir, and Chilegir) is a village and municipality in the Khachmaz Rayon of Azerbaijan.  It has a population of 609.  The municipality consists of the villages of Çılğır and Məncəroba.

References 

Populated places in Khachmaz District